Fakir Mohan University (FM University) is a state university located at Nuapadhi, Balasore, Odisha, India. It is named after Odia writer Fakir Mohan Senapati.

History
This university was established by the Government of Odisha, under Section 32 of the Odisha Universities Act, 1989 (Act 5 of 1989). It was carved out of the Utkal University in 1999 and acts as an affiliating university.Professor Gorachand Patnaik an eminent educationist of the state and former Principal of Ravenshaw college is the founding Vice Chancellor of the University. FM University has 93 colleges and 15,000 students at the graduate and postgraduate levels. It is the only university in India that offers a postgraduate course in Ballistics.

Campuses
In March 2021 Union minister Pratap Chandra Sarangi inaugurated New Marine Bioresource and Biotechnology Centre at University Balasore campus.

Colleges 
FM University affiliates 96 colleges including two autonomous i.e., FM autonomous college and Bhadrak autonomous college, one medical college and 14 professional colleges. Its jurisdiction extends over two districts Balasore and Bhadrak.

Departments
 Dept. of Physics
 Dept. of Bioscience and Biotechnology 
 Dept. of Botany
 Dept. of Business Management
 Dept. of Chemistry
 Dept. of Commerce
 Dept. of Computer Science
 Dept. of Education
 Dept. of Environmental Science
 Dept. of Geography
 Dept. of Geology
 Dept. of History & Archaeology
 Dept. of Journalism & Mass Communication
 Dept. of Language and Literature
 Dept. of Mathematics
 Dept. of Population Studies
 Dept. of Social Science
 Dept. of Zoology
 Dept. of Library Science
 Dept. of Micro Biology
 Dept. of Anthropology
 Dept. of PMIR
 Dept. of MSW
 Dept. of Psychology

Facilities 
The university has a computer lab, bioscience (botany & zoology) and biotechnology lab, BIF- computer lab (at Dept. of Biosciences and Biotechnology), environmental science lab and Physics lab.

There is a centralised computer centre, central library with Internet connection (12 hrs open).

Welfare facilities include UCO bank, two ATMs (SBI and UCO), one canteen, a common gym for both boys and girls, a mini indoor stadium, one cricket field, one volley field, one boys hostel, two girls hostel, staff quarters and a guest house.

Notable alumni 
 Gopanarayan Das

References

External links
Official website

 
Autonomous Colleges of Odisha
Department of Higher Education, Odisha
Universities in Odisha
Education in Balasore district
1999 establishments in Orissa
Educational institutions established in 1999
Balasore